Live at the Fillmore is a live album by Ozomatli, released in 2005. The album was released as a CD/DVD, the DVD being the same performance, with extra tracks and special features. It was recorded at The Fillmore, an auditorium in San Francisco.

Critical reception
AllMusic wrote: "Passionate, diverse, fiercely independent, and ardently political, Ozomatli have an ace in the hole: they're one of the best dance bands in recent memory." The Orlando Sentinel wrote that the album "is no substitute for being there, but it hints at how wonderful the band is on stage." The Denver Post called the album "excellent," writing that it "captures the spirit of the show."

CD Track Listing

 Dos Cosas Ciertas - 3:50
 Believe - 6:39
 (Who Discovered) America? - 4:11
 Eva - 4:59
 Saturday Night - 4:16
 Cuando Canto - 5:15
 Chango - 4:46
 Love and Hope - 4:57
 Como Ves - 2:45
 La Misma Canción - 7:54

DVD Chapter Listing

 Intro
 Dos Cosas Ciertas
 Believe
 (Who Discovered) America?
 Street Signs
 Elevation; Coming Up Part 2
 Cumbia de los Muertos
 Saturday Night
 Cuando Canto
 Chango
 Esa Morena
 Love and Hope
 Como Ves
 La Misma Canción
 Samba

Personnel
Ozomatli
Wil-Dog Abers – bass, vocals
Ulises Bella – saxophone, vocals, clarinet
Sheffer Bruton – trombone
Mario Calire – drums
DJ Spinobi – turntables
Jabu – rap
Raúl Pacheco – guitar, vocals
Justin Porée – percussion, rap vocals
Asdru Sierra – lead vocals, trumpet, keyboard
Jiro Yamaguchi – percussion, tabla

References

Ozomatli albums
Albums recorded at the Fillmore
2005 live albums
2005 video albums
Live video albums
Live Rock en Español albums